The 2016 White House shooting occurred on May 20, 2016, when Jesse Olivieri attacked the White House security checkpoint. The Secret Service shot and arrested him. After the incident, Secret Service authorities closed the White House for 45 minutes and also blocked nearby streets. Primary investigations showed that there is no connection with terrorists.

The incident 
On the afternoon of May 20, a suspected man with a firearm approached the White House security checkpoint at 17th and E Street. Secret Service agents shot him in the stomach and transported him to George Washington University Hospital. Officer of security forces gave a verbal warning to stop and drop his firearm. David Lacovetti, Secret Service spokesman, said, "when the subject failed to comply with the verbal commands, he was shot once by a secret service agent and taken into custody." Ranjit Singh, the incident witness, explained "white guy" with a gun in his right hand approaching police who were yelling at him to drop it.

After the incident, the Secret Service closed the White House for about 45 minutes. Also, the forces blocked streets between 16th and 17th Streets NW and a mall near the Washington Monument. At the time of the incident, Barack Obama was in Maryland. Vice President Joe Biden was in the White House at that time and was moved to a secure location during the incident. The White House official stated no one was injured at the White House.

Post-arrest investigations 
The law enforcement official identified Jesse Olivieri as the White House shooter. He is from Ashland, Pennsylvania and 30 years old. The officials found bullets for a .22 caliber weapon in his car near the incident location. According to primary investigations, there is not any relation with terrorists.  Olivieri had a history of mental illness, including paranoid delusions that he was under surveillance, and had been hospitalized twice by his parents, in 2006 and 2009.

Jesse Olivieri pled guilty to impeding federal officers with a dangerous weapon in September 2016, he was sentenced to eight months imprisonment.

See also 
 2011 White House shooting
 List of White House security breaches

References 

Crimes in Washington, D.C.
History of the White House
2016 in Washington, D.C.
Attacks in the United States in 2016
May 2016 crimes in the United States